Glogauer may refer to:

Surnames 
 Avigdor Glogauer (1725–1810), a German Jewish grammarian and poet.
 Michael Glogauer, a Canadian dentist, scientist, and scholar.
 Israel Lovy aka Israel Glogauer (1773  – 1832), ḥazzan and composer.

Other 
 Glogauer Liederbuch,  a Liederhandschrift (medieval songbook)
 Karl Glogauer, a character that appears in novels Behold the Man (1969) and Breakfast in the Ruins (1972).